Michiana is a region in northern Indiana and southwestern Michigan centered on the city of South Bend, Indiana. The Chamber of Commerce of St. Joseph County, Indiana defines Michiana as St. Joseph County and "counties that contribute at least 500 inbound commuting workers to St. Joseph County daily." Those counties include Elkhart,  La Porte, Marshall, St. Joseph, and Starke in Indiana, and Berrien and Cass in Michigan. As of the 2010 census, those seven counties had a population of 856,377 (647,271 in Indiana and 209,106 in Michigan).

The name is a portmanteau of "Michigan" and "Indiana" and was chosen as the winning entry, purportedly submitted by Indiana politician Thurman C. Crook, among others, in a contest to name the area held by the Associated South Bend Merchants in 1934. The term is frequently used throughout the area, particularly by local radio and television stations based in South Bend that serve the entire area, but also by businesses that seek to draw customers from Indiana into Michigan or vice versa. A 2016 report stated that residents in the Michigan portion are particularly fond of the term because it contains part of the state name as opposed to generic terms for the area such as "the South Bend region."

Government
The Michiana Area Council of Governments (MACOG) is the official Metropolitan Planning Organization for north central Indiana and the South Bend-Mishawaka metropolitan area.  MACOG conducts planning for transportation, water quality, and economic development. Currently, 22 cities and towns as well as 29 townships participate in MACOG. Despite the Michiana name, none of these participants are currently from the state of Michigan, although Berrien and Cass Counties were until they along with Van Buren County were combined into their own MPO, what is now called the Southwest Michigan Planning Commission.

Counties

Indiana Counties
 St. Joseph County: Population: 272,912 (as of 2020)
 Elkhart County: Population: 207,047 (as of 2020)
 LaPorte County: Population: 111,467 (as of 2010)
 Marshall County: Population: 46,095 (as of 2020)
 Starke County: Population: 23,363 (as of 2010)

Michigan Counties
 Berrien County: Population: 154,316 (as of 2020)
 Cass County: Population: 51,589 (as of 2020)

Largest cities

For a complete list, see List of cities and towns in Michiana

South Bend, Indiana Population: 103,453 (2020)
Elkhart, Indiana Population: 53,923 (2020)
Mishawaka, Indiana Population: 51,063 (2020)
Goshen, Indiana Population: 34,517 (2020)
Michigan City, Indiana Population: 32,075 (2020)
Granger, Indiana Population: 30,337 (2020)
La Porte, Indiana Population: 22,471 (2020)
Niles, Michigan Population: 11,333 (2015)
Benton Harbor, Michigan Population: 9,976 (2015)

Greater Michiana

Greater Michiana includes the following 15 counties in Indiana and Michigan:

The Chamber of Commerce of St. Joseph County (Indiana) defines Greater Michiana as "counties within a 60-mile driving distance to St. Joseph County" that are not included in the seven counties making up Michiana "proper." However, the driving distance presumably refers to the distance between the metropolitan South Bend area and significant population centers in outlying areas, since a strict definition allowing for 60 miles from any point in St. Joseph County would add even more counties to the Greater Michiana area. For example, Walkerton in southwestern St. Joseph County is located approximately 30 miles from Monterey in northeastern Pulaski County, yet Pulaski is not included in the Chamber's list of Greater Michiana counties.

Because Michiana is not a legal or political entity, opinions differ about what counties and communities constitute the region. Some definitions of the entire Michiana area include fewer than 15 counties; others include Pulaski County and exclude some other outlying counties, notably, those in extreme Northwest Indiana, whose residents identify more closely with Chicago than with the South Bend area.

Michiana's borders overlap with those of the Chicago metropolitan area, and the two regions have significant cultural ties. South Bend in particular has strong ties to Chicago: it is home to the last stop on the South Shore Line, a commuter rail line connecting Chicago's downtown and south side to Indiana, and the nearby University of Notre Dame is noted for its strong connection with Chicago. Berrien County, Michigan, is known as a common summer vacation destination for wealthy Chicagoans; the Wall Street Journal called the area "the Hamptons of the Midwest".

Economy
Throughout the twentieth century, the economy of Michiana was based on heavy industry, especially as connected to the automobile industry centered in nearby Detroit. In 1960, 41% of the employment was in manufacturing, followed by 17% in hospitality 8% in business services, 6% in transportation, 5% in education, and 5% in agriculture, with healthcare at 4% and government at 2%.  Deindustrialization had a major impact after 1970, and by 2013, only 27% of the employment was in manufacturing, 20% was in hospitality, 12% in healthcare, 11% in government, 8% in business services, 5% in transportation, and 4% in education.  In 2013, three of the top 10 Michiana employers were in the Elkhart area and focused on recreational vehicles, trailers, and related products, including Forest River with 7600 employees, Thor Industries with 7500,  and Drew industries with 4700.  Many hospitals were consolidated, as health spending doubled and tripled. By 2013 three health systems were among the top 10 employers: Beacon Health System (7000 employees;  based in Elkhart and South Bend); Lakeland Regional Health System (4100 employees; based in St. Joseph and Niles), and Saint Joseph Regional Medical Center (2700; based in Mishawaka and Plymouth). The University of Notre Dame had 5700 employees in the educational sector, and the South Bend Community School Corporation had 3000. Whirlpool Corporation, the appliance maker, with 3400 employees, is based in Benton Harbor. Martin's Super Markets operated 21 grocery stores in the region with 3100 employees.  With the loss of manufacturing, per capita income in Michiana has declined from 105% of the national average in 1960 to 82% in 2013.

Points of interest
For more information and other points of interest not listed below, see the articles on the individual communities in the region.

Historical sites
The History Museum (South Bend, Indiana)

Museums
Fort St. Joseph Museum (Niles, Michigan)
LaPorte County Historical Society Museum (LaPorte County, Indiana)
Old Lighthouse Museum (Michigan City, Indiana)
Studebaker National Museum (South Bend, Indiana) (R.V. Museum) (Elkhart, IN)

Universities

Andrews University (Berrien Springs, Michigan)
Bethel University (Indiana) (Mishawaka, Indiana)
Goshen College (Indiana) (Goshen, Indiana)
Holy Cross College (Indiana) (Notre Dame, Indiana)
Indiana University South Bend (South Bend, Indiana)
Saint Mary's College (Indiana) (Notre Dame, Indiana)
University of Notre Dame (Notre Dame, Indiana)
Ivy Tech Community College (Elkhart, Indiana and South Bend, Indiana)
Western Michigan University (Kalamazoo, Michigan, part of Greater Michiana)

Parks
Indiana Dunes National Lakeshore
Kingsbury Fish and Wildlife Area (Indiana)
Potato Creek State Park (Indiana)
Warren Dunes State Park (Michigan)
Warren Woods State Park (Michigan)

Transportation

South Bend International Airport

South Shore Line

See also

Northern Indiana
Southern Michigan
West Michigan
Kentuckiana

References

External links
Goshen Chamber of Commerce
Chamber of Commerce of St. Joseph County
Michiana Area Council of Government
Michiana Directory
Michiana Roads
Northern Indiana Center for History

Regions of Indiana
Regions of Michigan